Odei Onaindia Zabala (born 7 December 1989) is a Spanish professional footballer who plays as a defender for Indian Super League club Hyderabad.

Club career
Born in Lekeitio, Biscay, Basque Country, Odei joined Athletic Bilbao's Lezama in 2007, from hometown side Lekeitio FT. He made his senior debut in the 2008–09 campaign, while on loan at Tercera División side CD Elgoibar; upon returning, he was assigned to Athletic's farm team in the same category.

Odei first arrived in Segunda División B in July 2011, joining SD Amorebieta. He continued to appear in the division in the following years, representing Barakaldo CF, Burgos CF (two stints), Marbella FC (where he only spent 20 days with the squad before being released), Bilbao Athletic, UD Melilla and CD Mirandés; with the latter, he achieved promotion to Segunda División in 2019.

On 9 July 2019, Odei renewed his contract with the Rojillos for a further season. He made his professional debut at the age of 29 on 8 September, starting in a 2–1 home win against Real Oviedo.

Odei scored his first professional goal on 15 January 2020, netting a last-minute equalizer in a 3–3 draw at Cádiz CF. On 19 September, he moved abroad for the first time in his career, after agreeing to a one-year deal with Indian Super League club Hyderabad FC.

On 7 July 2021, Odei rejoined his former club Mirandés on a one-year contract.

In July 2022, Odei returned to India and defending Indian Super League champions Hyderabad, on a one-year deal.

Career statistics

Club

References

External links

1989 births
Living people
Sportspeople from Biscay
Spanish footballers
Footballers from the Basque Country (autonomous community)
Association football defenders
Segunda División players
Segunda División B players
Tercera División players
CD Basconia footballers
SD Amorebieta footballers
Barakaldo CF footballers
Burgos CF footballers
Marbella FC players
Bilbao Athletic footballers
UD Melilla footballers
CD Mirandés footballers
Spanish expatriate sportspeople in India
Indian Super League players
Hyderabad FC players
Athletic Bilbao footballers